İslamköy may refer to:

İslamköy, a former name of Banaz, a town in Uşak Province, Turkey
İslamköy, Kastamonu, a village in Kastamonu Province, Turkey
İslamköy, Devrek, a village in Devrek District, Zonguldak Province, Turkey
İslamköy, İliç
İslamköy, Kahta, a village in the District of Kahta, Adıyaman Province
İslamköy, Kulp